Autopista Central ("Central Highway", in Spanish) is a privatized, partially submerged highway in Chile forming part of the Ruta 5. It forms part of the urban highway network of Santiago, all of which incorporate a free flow toll system.

Within the network the Autopista Central forms the primary north–south connection through the centre of the city, the northern terminus is at the interchange with Vespucio Norte Express, where it continues northward as Autopista del Aconcagua. The southern terminus is located immediately north of the Maipo River, after which it continues as Autopista del Maipo.

Autopista Central really consists of two highways: The main section runs the full length of the route, and the second, called "Eje General Velásquez", runs further to the west, bypassing the downtown districts.

The eastern highway is the section of Chile Route 5 that traverses Santiago.

History
Previously, many city blocks of downtown Santiago were cleared of buildings. Part of the removed earth was used to create an embankment on the south bank of the Mapocho River, which was planned to carry the tracks of a new railroad running to the Estación Mapocho, but the project was never executed.

References

Bibliography

External links

 Autopista Central official web site

Toll roads in Chile